Bimble is an unincorporated community in Knox County, Kentucky, United States.

The name Bimble was formed by compounding the names of two local farm animals, Bim and Bill. The village was previously known as Yeager until 1966.

References

Unincorporated communities in Knox County, Kentucky
Unincorporated communities in Kentucky